Anesti Qendro (born 23 December 1973) is a retired Albanian football midfielder.

Club career
He was a squad member of Teuta Durrës, when they surprisingly won the league title in 1994.

Het later played in the Italian amateur leagues.

International career
Qendro played for the Albania national under-21 football team and made his senior debut for Albania in a May 1992 FIFA World Cup qualification match against the Republic of Ireland and earned a total of 3 caps, scoring 1 goal. His final international was a November 1995 friendly match 2-0 win over Bosnia in which he scored the first goal.

Honours
Albanian Superliga: 1
 1994

References

External links

1973 births
Living people
Association football midfielders
Albanian footballers
Albania under-21 international footballers
Albania international footballers
KF Teuta Durrës players
Kategoria Superiore players
Albanian expatriate footballers
Expatriate footballers in Italy
Albanian expatriate sportspeople in Italy